Nakhon Ratchasima United Football Club (Thai สโมสรฟุตบอลนครราชสีมา ยูไนเต็ด), is a Thai football club based in Nakhon Ratchasima Province, Thailand. The club is currently playing in the Thai League 3 Northeastern region.

History
The club founded in 2005 as Sriracha-Sannibat Samut Prakan F.C.

In 2016, This club was token over Pattaya F.C. from Khor Cup and is changed the name to Pattaya City and change the club's official logo is the whale, hence their nickname is Killer whale.

In 2017, The club is token over Huai Thalaeng F.C. from Khor Cup and is changed the name to Huai Thalaeng United F.C. and change the club's official logo is the Locomotive, hence their nickname is Killer Locomotive.

In 2020, The club was renamed to Nakhon Ratchasima United F.C. and changed the text on the club's logo to Nakhon Ratchasima United too.

Crest history
The club has changed the texts on the logo to Nakhon Ratchasima United in 2020.

Yo-Yo club
The club has somewhat become known as a yo-yo club in the Thai football scene, being relegated and promoted to and from the top flight on five successive occasions between 2008 and 2012. The sequence was broken in 2012 when they finished one place off the promotion spots in 2012 Division 1 race.

Stadium and locations by season records

Record

P = Played
W = Games won
D = Games drawn
L = Games lost
F = Goals for
A = Goals against
Pts = Points
Pos = Final position
TPL = Thai Premier League
QR1 = First Qualifying Round
QR2 = Second Qualifying Round
QR3 = Third Qualifying Round
QR4 = Fourth Qualifying Round
RInt = Intermediate Round
R1 = Round 1
R2 = Round 2
R3 = Round 3
R4 = Round 4
R5 = Round 5
R6 = Round 6
GR = Group stage
QF = Quarter-finals
SF = Semi-finals
RU = Runners-up
S = Shared
W = Winners

Players

Current squad

Coaching staff

See also
 Sriracha F.C.

References

External links
 Official Facebook

 
Association football clubs established in 2005
Football clubs in Thailand
Nakhon Ratchasima province
2005 establishments in Thailand